Guys and Dolls is a 1955 American musical film starring Marlon Brando, Jean Simmons, Frank Sinatra, and Vivian Blaine. The picture was made by Samuel Goldwyn Productions and distributed by Metro-Goldwyn-Mayer (MGM). It was directed by Joseph L. Mankiewicz, who also wrote the screenplay. The film is based on the 1950 Broadway musical by composer and lyricist Frank Loesser, with a book by Jo Swerling and Abe Burrows, which, in turn, was loosely based on "The Idyll of Miss Sarah Brown" (1933) and "Blood Pressure", two short stories by Damon Runyon. Dances were choreographed by Michael Kidd, who had staged the dances for the Broadway production.

Plot 
Gambler Nathan Detroit seeks to organize an unlicensed craps game, but the police, led by Lieutenant Brannigan, are "putting on the heat."  Nathan's usual locations are turning him away due to Brannigan's intimidating pressure. The Biltmore garage will allow Nathan to hold a game, but the owner requires a $1,000 security deposit, which Nathan does not have. Adding to his problems, Nathan's fiancée, Miss Adelaide, a nightclub singer, wants to get married after being engaged for 14 years. She also wants him to go straight, but he only is good at organizing illegal gambling.

Nathan spots an old acquaintance, Sky Masterson, a gambler willing to bet on virtually anything and for high amounts. To win the $1,000 security deposit, Nathan bets Sky that he cannot take a girl of Nathan's choosing to dinner in Havana, Cuba. Nathan then nominates Sergeant Sarah Brown, a sister at the Save a Soul Mission, which opposes gambling.

Sky pretends to be a repentant gambler as a means to meet Sarah. Sky proposes a bargain: He will recruit a dozen sinners into the Mission for her Thursday-night meeting if she will have dinner with him in Havana. With General Matilda Cartwright threatening to close the Mission's Broadway branch due to low attendance, Sarah agrees to the date.

Meanwhile, confident that he will win the bet, Nathan gathers all the gamblers, including a visitor that Harry the Horse has invited: Big Jule, a mobster. When Lieutenant Brannigan appears, Benny Southstreet claims they are celebrating Nathan marrying Adelaide. Nathan is shocked, but is forced to play along. Later, he realizes he has lost his bet and must marry Adelaide.

Over the course of their short stay in Cuba, Sky breaks down Sarah's social inhibitions with Bacardi-spiked "milkshakes." They begin to fall in love. They return to Broadway at dawn and meet the Save a Soul Mission band, which has been parading all night on Sky's advice. Police sirens are heard, and the gamblers, led by Nathan Detroit, flee out through the back room of the empty Mission where they were holding a crap game.

The police arrive too late to make any arrests, but Lieutenant Brannigan finds Sarah and the other Save a Soul members being absent unlikely to be a coincidence and suspects Sky. Sarah is equally suspicious that Sky has had something to do with organizing the crap game at the Mission, and she angrily takes her leave of him, refusing to accept his denials.

Sky still has to make good his arrangement with Sarah to provide sinners to the Mission. Sarah would rather forget the whole thing, but Uncle Arvide Abernathy, who acts as a kind of father figure to her, warns Sky that "If you don't make that marker good, I'm going to buzz it all over town you're a welcher."

Nathan has continued the crap game in a sewer. With his revolver visible in its shoulder holster, Big Jule, who has lost all his money, forces Nathan to play against him while he cheats, cleaning Nathan out. Sky enters and knocks Big Jule down, and removes his pistol. Sky, who has been stung and devastated by Sarah's rejection, lies to Nathan that he lost the bet about taking her to Havana and pays Nathan the $1,000. Nathan tells Big Jule he now has money to play him again, but Harry the Horse says that Big Jule cannot play without cheating because "he cannot make a pass to save his soul." Sky overhears this, and the phrasing inspires him to make a bold bet: He will roll the dice, and if he loses, he will give all the other gamblers $1,000 each; if he wins, they are all to attend a prayer meeting at the Mission.

The Mission is near closing when suddenly the gamblers arrive, filling the room; Sky won the roll. They grudgingly confess their sins, though with little repentance. Nicely-Nicely Johnson however, recalling a dream he had the night before, seems to have an authentic connection to the Mission's aim, and this satisfies everyone.

When Nathan tells Sarah that Sky lost the Cuba bet, which she knows he won, she hurries off to make up with him. It all ends with a double wedding in the middle of Times Square, with Sky marrying Sarah, and Nathan marrying Adelaide.

Cast 

Robert Alda had originated the role of Sky Masterson on Broadway in 1950. For the movie, Gene Kelly at first, seemed a serious candidate for the part. Still, it went to Marlon Brando, partly because Metro-Goldwyn-Mayer would not loan Kelly for the production, and because Goldwyn wanted to cast Brando, the world's biggest box office draw by a wide margin at that time. Ironically, the film ended up being distributed by MGM, Kelly's home studio. Frank Sinatra had coveted the role of Sky Masterson, and his relations with Brando were strained. Hollywood critic James Bacon quotes Sinatra telling director Joe Mankiewicz, "When Mumbles is through rehearsing, I'll come out." Sinatra had been considered for the role of Terry Malloy in On the Waterfront; both roles went to Brando.

Because Betty Grable was not available to play Miss Adelaide, Goldwyn cast Vivian Blaine, who had originated the role on stage. Marilyn Monroe had wanted the part of Adelaide, but a telephone request from her did not influence Joe Mankiewicz, who wanted Blaine from the original production.  In addition to Blaine, Stubby Kaye, B.S. Pully, and Johnny Silver all repeated their Broadway roles in the film.

Goldwyn wanted Grace Kelly for Sarah Brown, the Save-a-Soul sister. When she turned the part down because of other commitments, Goldwyn contacted Deborah Kerr, who was unavailable. The third choice was Jean Simmons, who had played opposite Brando in Désirée. Goldwyn was surprised by Simmons's sweet voice and strong acting and ultimately believed the love story worked better in the film than on stage. "I'm so happy," he said after seeing the rushes one day, "that I couldn't get Grace Kelly." Director Joe Mankiewicz later called Simmons "the dream...a fantastically talented and enormously underestimated girl. In terms of talent, Jean Simmons is so many heads and shoulders above most of her contemporaries, one wonders why she didn't become the great star she could have been."

Musical numbers 
At Samuel Goldwyn and Joseph L. Mankiewicz's request, Frank Loesser wrote three new songs for the film: "Pet Me Poppa", "(Your Eyes Are the Eyes of) A Woman in Love", and "Adelaide", the last written specifically for Sinatra. Five songs from the stage show were not included in the movie: "A Bushel and a Peck," "I've Never Been in Love Before," "My Time of Day" (although portions of these three songs are heard instrumentally as background music), "Marry the Man Today," and "More I Cannot Wish You". Critic Peter Filichia wrote, "Those who only know musicals from movies have missed out on some great songs from the Broadway scores."  He cited "A Bushel and a Peck" as an example, replaced in the film with the song "Pet Me, Poppa". Goldwyn did not like "A Bushel and a Peck" and said, "I just wanted a new song in the picture."  Another song, "I've Never Been in Love Before," was replaced with "A Woman in Love".  "Adelaide," sung by Sinatra, was added for the movie.  

The musical numbers performed by Jean Simmons and Marlon Brando were sung by the actors themselves, without dubbing by professional singers.

Awards and honors 

In 2004, the AFI ranked the song "Luck Be a Lady" at No. 42 on their list of the 100 greatest film songs, AFI's 100 Years...100 Songs. In 2006 Guys and Dolls ranked No. 23 on the American Film Institute's list of best musicals.

Reception 
Guys and Dolls opened on November 3, 1955, to mostly positive reviews. Rotten Tomatoes reports that 91% out of 33 critics have given the film a positive review, with a rating average of 7.7/10 and the consensus: "An escapist and inventive cinemascope delight, Guys and Dolls glistens thanks to the charm of its ensemble." Casting Marlon Brando has long been somewhat controversial, although Variety wrote "The casting is good all the way." This was the only Samuel Goldwyn film released through MGM since he left Goldwyn Pictures in 1922. Its estimated budget was over $5 million. It earned over $6.8 million in theater rentals from the United States and Canada and Variety ranked it as the No. 1 moneymaking film of 1956.

According to MGM records, the film earned $6,801,000 in the U.S. and Canada and $2,262,000 in other markets, resulting in a total of $9,063,000.

Planned remake 
20th Century Fox acquired the film rights to the musical in early 2013 and was planning a remake. In March 2019, TriStar Pictures acquired the remake rights, with Bill Condon hired as director a year later.

See also 
 List of American films of 1955

References 
Notes

External links 
 
 
 
 
 Variety Review

1955 films
1950s English-language films
1950s romantic musical films
American romantic musical films
Best Musical or Comedy Picture Golden Globe winners
Films based on adaptations
Films based on musicals
Films based on short fiction
Films directed by Joseph L. Mankiewicz
Films featuring a Best Musical or Comedy Actress Golden Globe winning performance
Films set in Cuba
Films set in New York City
Films about gambling
Metro-Goldwyn-Mayer films
Samuel Goldwyn Productions films
Films with screenplays by Joseph L. Mankiewicz
CinemaScope films
1950s American films